The Gigantes de Carolina are a baseball team in the Puerto Rican Professional Baseball League (LBPPR). Based in the city of Carolina, Puerto Rico, the Gigantes play at Roberto Clemente Stadium. There is now an affiliated football club, Gigantes de Carolina, also playing out of the Roberto Clemente Stadium.

Puerto Rico Baseball League
On November 18, 2009, the Gigantes defeated the Criollos. After defeating the Indios, the Gigantes gained the league's lead for a brief period of time. On November 20, 2009, the team defeated the Leones, scoring 17 hits. In their next game, the Leones defeated Carolina. On November 29, 2009, the team lost to the Gigantes del Cibao in inter-league action. On December 1, 2009, the Criollos defeated the Gigantes to win their first home game of the season.

References

http://gigantesprbl.blogspot.com/

2000 establishments in Puerto Rico
Liga de Béisbol Profesional Roberto Clemente
Professional baseball teams in Puerto Rico
Carolina, Puerto Rico